Giovanni Tosi was an Italian sprinter. He competed in the men's 400 metres at the 1920 Summer Olympics.

References

Year of birth missing
Year of death missing
Athletes (track and field) at the 1920 Summer Olympics
Italian male sprinters
Olympic athletes of Italy
Place of birth missing